Pacheia Ammos is a village in the municipality of Ierapetra on the island of Crete in Greece. It is located on the north coast of the island, 15 km to the north of the city of Ierapetra, at the fork in the road that leads to Heraklion in the west and Sitia in the east.

Attractions 
 The Minoan settlement of Gournia
 The Minoan settlement of Vasiliki
 The church of Agios Nikolaos
 The church of Agios Analipsi
 The INSTAP study center

Populated places in Lasithi
Villages in Greece